Stauroderus scalaris, the large mountain grasshopper, is a species of 'short-horned grasshoppers' belonging to the family Acrididae subfamily Gomphocerinae.

Subspecies
Stauroderus includes the following subspecies:
 Stauroderus scalaris demavendi  Popov, G.B., 1951
 Stauroderus scalaris scalaris  (Fischer von Waldheim, 1846)
 Stauroderus scalaris znojkoi  (Miram, 1938)

Description
It is the largest species of grasshopper in Europe. The basic coloration of the body varies from pale or bright green to yellow, with dark-brownish wings and tegmina. Femora of hind legs vary from yellow to reddish. In the males median and ulnar wing cells are quite large, with parallel veins. The adults usually live in colonies and the males emit whirring stridulations to attract females.

These grasshoppers can be encountered from July through September especially in high-altitude alpine meadows and pastures.

Distribution
This species is present in most of Europe, in the Near East, and in the eastern Palearctic realm.

References 

Gomphocerinae
Insects described in 1846
Orthoptera of Europe